Dalvik may refer to:

Places
 Dalvík, a village in Iceland
 Dalvík/Reynir, a football club from Dalvík, Iceland
 UMFS Dalvík, an Icelandic sports club in Dalvík, Iceland
 Dalvik, Jönköping, Jönköping , Sweden
 Dalvik Church

Software
 Dalvik (software), the discontinued virtual machine used in Android
 Dalvik Turbo virtual machine, an alternative to Google's implementation of the Dalvik virtual machine